The Wonder Years: Music From the Emmy Award-Winning Show & Its Era is a soundtrack album to the TV series The Wonder Years. The album, released in 1989, contains seven modern cover songs rather than simply original music from the series, which earned it many unfavorable reviews.

The album was reissued in 2016 for Black Friday Record Store Day, in yellow translucent vinyl. It was previously out of print for nearly thirty years.

Track listing
"With a Little Help from My Friends" - Joe Cocker
"Baby I Need Your Loving" - Was (Not Was)
"Drift Away" - Judson Spence
"For What It's Worth (Stop, Hey What's That Sound)" - Buffalo Springfield
"Get Together" - Indigo Girls
"In The Still Of The Night" (I'll Remember)" - Debbie Gibson
"Twentieth Century Fox" - The Escape Club
"Ruby Tuesday" - Julian Lennon
"Teach Your Children" - Crosby, Stills, Nash & Young
"Brown Eyed Girl" - Van Morrison
"Will You Love Me Tomorrow" - Carole King
"Come Home (Wonder Years)" - Debbie Gibson
"Peace Train" - Richie Havens (CD bonus track)

References

The Wonder Years
1989 soundtrack albums
Atlantic Records soundtracks
Record Store Day releases
Television soundtracks